Craig Russell (born 16 June 1977) is a Welsh actor, writer, producer who is known for his film & television work.

Background
Craig Russell was born in Lewisham, South London and raised in Cwmtwrch, a village in the Upper Swansea Valley in South Wales. He attended Maesydderwen Comprehensive School with fellow actors Eve Myles, Steven Meo and Richard Corgan.

Acting
Craig has worked extensively in film and television. His film work includes lead roles in Marc Price's Magpie, war film The 95th and psychological thriller Eider Steeps. Craig has also appeared in Marc Price's multi award-winning Zombie film Colin. Alongside Jason Flemyng and Dominic Cooper in Anazapta. With Michael Clarke Duncan and Til Schweiger in One Way. With James D'Arcy, Joe Gilgun and Andrew Shim in Screwed. In Noel Clarke's film The Anomaly along with Brian Cox and Ian Somerhalder, and with John Hannah, Ed Stoppard and Warren Brown in Genesis. His many television appearances include EastEnders, Doctors, Is Harry on the Boat?, Dream Team, Score, Belonging, High Hopes, Battlefield Britain and Fish Out of Water. Craig played Detective Inspector Mark Gascoyne in 21 episodes of the Channel 4 soap Hollyoaks. He played the regular role of Clive in two series of the S4C sitcom Anita. He works regularly with comedy director Jamie Adams and can be seen in his forthcoming feature films Songbird alongside Cobie Smulders and Jessica Hynes as well as in Wild Honey Pie with Jemima Kirke, Sarah Solamani and Brett Goldstein.

Writing and producing
As well as playing the title role, Craig also writes and produces the YouTube comedy web series Grave Danger with Dave Granger. His short film Just the 2 of Us was premiered at the HollyShorts Film Festival in Hollywood in 2011. Canaries is Craig's first feature as producer and he stars alongside Aled Pugh, Richard Mylan, Hannah Daniel, Steven Meo and Robert Pugh. Shot on location in Wales, the U.S. and Vietnam it received its world premier at the Prince Charles Cinema in Leicester Square as part of the London FrightFest Film Festival on 26 August 2017.

Personal life
In 2011 Craig married former Casualty actress Kate Edney. They have two sons and live in Falmouth, Cornwall.

Filmography

References

External links
 
 Dave Granger YouTube Channel
 Making the move to Cornwall: Falmouth

1977 births
English film producers
English male film actors
English male television actors
English screenwriters
English male screenwriters
Living people
Male actors from London
People from the London Borough of Lewisham